William Harry Davis, Sr. (April 12, 1923 – August 11, 2006)  was an American civil rights activist, amateur boxing coach, civic leader, and businessman in Minneapolis, Minnesota. He overcame poverty, childhood polio, and racial prejudice to become a humanitarian. Davis is remembered for his warm and positive personality, for coaching Golden Gloves champions in the upper Midwest, and for managing the Olympics boxing team that won nine gold medals. His contributions to public education in his community are enduring. A leader in desegregation during the Civil Rights Movement, Davis helped Americans find a way forward to racial equality.

Biography

Early years 
Davis was the son of Elizabeth Jackson, known as Libby, and Lee Davis, a Winnebago Dakota Sioux who played catcher for the Kansas City Monarchs of Negro league baseball. They lived in north Minneapolis, in a poor neighborhood near 6th and Lyndale Avenues North called the Hellhole, known for prostitution, drinking, and gambling. Later the area was covered by the junction of Olson Memorial Highway and Interstate 94.

Davis was paralyzed from the waist down by polio at the age of two or three until about the age of five. His mother had learned a polio treatment from an ancestor who was a doctor on a plantation in Virginia. She helped to free Davis from his illness through massage and warm water wraps, applying an iron to keep the wraps warm. Davis was the first African-American student at Michael Dowling School for Crippled Children. He was not allowed treatment at Shriners Hospital, but he received a great deal of help at the school from a visiting doctor from City Hospital. Later Elizabeth Kenny, an Australian nurse who joined the City Hospital staff in 1940, would found the Sister Kenny Rehabilitation Institute in Minneapolis and provide treatment and physical therapy similar to that used by Davis's mother.

While growing up Davis was known as Little Pops. His second home was the Phyllis Wheatley settlement house. Its director Gertrude Brown gave the area's children continuing education in a safe place to go after school. Davis must have gotten into trouble at some point as it was a juvenile parole officer who suggested he attend Phyllis Wheatley. There with his friends, Davis learned boxing, etiquette, and Robert's Rules of Order. They met Chick Webb and danced to Duke Ellington and Count Basie who stayed there on tours to the Orpheum Theatre. In 1941, he graduated from North High School where he lettered in and won a city championship in boxing. Davis attended the University of Minnesota and later in life received an honorary doctorate in law from Macalester College.

Davis and his wife, Charlotte, a community leader, were married for 61 years. They had four children, Rita Lyell, Harry Jr., Richard, and Evan.

Career

Golden Gloves boxing

Phyllis Wheatley taught amateur boxxing as exercise and a fun sport, as well as to discourage street fighting, and as a form of self-defense. Davis founded the center's competitive boxing program during the 1940s, coached basketball, football, and baseball, and served on the center's board of directors for thirty years. Between 1945 and 1960, Phyllis Wheatley won most of the boxing championships for the upper Midwest region that included Minnesota, North Dakota, South Dakota, and Wisconsin.

Davis became the region's most successful coach and vice president of Golden Gloves. Davis taught "don't misuse it or abuse it," and three principles of body, mind, and conscience. Among his students were Clyde Bellecourt who cofounded the American Indian Movement and Jimmy Jackson who won a national Golden Gloves championship in 1957. He established a strong  relationship to the other winners from Minneapolis, including Duane Bobick, Jack Graves, Virgil Hill, Roland Miller, Pat O'Connor, Don Sargeant, and Dave Sherbrooke. Davis was inducted into the Golden Gloves Hall of Fame.

Civic leadership
In 1945 he became a member of the National Association for the Advancement of Colored People (NAACP), an organization he influenced throughout his life. In 1957 Davis and other lay leaders worked with pastors Chester Pennington and C. M. Sexton on the merger of Border Methodist with Hennepin Avenue Methodist. The predominantly white downtown congregation now known as Hennepin Avenue United Methodist Church invited the Border congregation when they lost their church to urban redevelopment. In 1966 Davis and group of eight others founded the Twin Cities Opportunity Industrialization Center (TCOIC), a program both criticized for excessive spending and lauded for providing job training to local African Americans.

In 1967, after large-scale disturbances in several major U.S. cities, the largely African-American neighborhood around Plymouth Avenue in north Minneapolis witnessed urban unrest. After several buildings were set on fire, Davis worked with mayor Arthur Naftalin to resolve tensions between community members and the police. During this time Davis worked locally on the War on Poverty and founded the Urban Coalition of Minneapolis.

Davis served for twenty years on the Minneapolis school board, as chair beginning in 1974. A judge ordered Minneapolis to address concentrations of races in parts of the city and their schools. To reach enrollment goals counted by race, school closings, school busing, redistricting and other plans were tried beginning in 1972. Davis continued to be active in school issues as late as 2006, when he supported Thandiwe Peebles, who resigned as superintendent.

Mayoral run
The city of Minneapolis was comparatively progressive but racial segregation was the norm in the United States. The country saw racial violence and clashes with police sometimes called militant following the assassination of Martin Luther King Jr. in 1968. Part of an effort to build peace, Davis agreed to run for mayor in 1971 against the incumbent and independent Charles Stenvig, former head of the Minneapolis police federation, whom Davis later called his friend. Soon endorsed by the Democratic-Farmer-Labor Party, Davis ran as the city's first African-American mayoral candidate supported by a major political party.

When integration or desegregation began in the 1960s, black families sometimes experienced frightening persecution in Minneapolis by individuals and groups behaving like the latter-day Ku Klux Klan in southern cities. These forces were still present in the city in 1971. The Davis family received daily threats to their safety during the campaign. The FBI brought them guard dogs and the police department had to station guards at their home. White politicians, Donald M. Fraser, Hubert Humphrey and Walter Mondale sometimes accompanied Davis. As expected, Stenvig won reelection. Davis won the admiration of many.

Among large cities in the United States who had African-American mayors about this time, Cleveland elected Carl Stokes in 1967, and Newark, New Jersey, elected Kenneth Gibson in 1970. In 1973, Thomas Bradley and Maynard H. Jackson won in Los Angeles and Atlanta. Minneapolis did not elect a black mayor for twenty more years. Sharon Sayles Belton, who saw Davis's concession speech in 1971, assumed office in 1994 and served through 2001.

Star Tribune
Throughout his career, Davis was known to the Minneapolis newspapers who covered Golden Gloves regularly and it was in the news publishing industry that he became the city's first prominent black business executive who large numbers of the white population recognized. Earlier Davis was a production foreman and later employee services manager for Onan Corporation and the founding chief executive of the Urban Coalition. He started at what is now the Star Tribune newspaper in 1973. Davis became assistant vice president in public affairs and assistant vice president in employee services. When he retired in 1987 he was vice president of the paper's parent company, Cowles Media. The Star Tribune became part of McClatchy who sold it to Avista in 2006.

Olympic boxing

Davis served on the United States Olympic boxing committee during the 1970s and 1980s for Golden Gloves whose champions were eligible for Olympic competition. He was manager, responsible for the team's wellbeing, including lodging and logistics and medical care, for the second place trial team at the Summer Olympics in Montreal in 1976. In 1980 the United States led a boycott of the Summer Olympics in Moscow, where Cuba dominated men's boxing.

In 1984 in Los Angeles, Cuba was among the group of countries who boycotted with the Soviet Union. Under coach Pat Nappi, Davis was again team manager for the United States. Individual wins were contested and Evander Holyfield was disqualified. Paul Gonzales, Steve McCrory, Meldrick Taylor, Pernell Whitaker, Jerry Page, Mark Breland, Frank Tate, Henry Tillman and Tyrell Biggs won gold medals and Virgil Hill won silver. Except when the United States competed alone in St. Louis in 1904 and won every medal, the 1984 team's nine gold and one silver is the best record in Olympic boxing. Cuba returned in 1992 in the Barcelona games to win seven gold and one silver with no boycotts.

Later years
Davis received at least seventy nine civic leadership awards. In 2002, West Central Academy, a Minneapolis middle school, was renamed W. Harry Davis Academy. A foundation, award and scholarship also carry his name. Davis published his autobiography Overcoming in 2002. In 2003, he published Changemaker, a history of the civil rights movement in Minnesota for young readers aged 10 and up, based on his memoirs. Lori Sturdevant of the Star Tribune edited both books, which were published by the historical society of Afton, Minnesota.

Davis recovered from lymphoma during the 1980s. A recurrence of the disease took his life about three years after his wife's death.

Bibliography

Notes

References

External links
Harry Davis Sr. at the African American Registry
W. Harry Davis Academy
Phyllis Wheatley Community Center

1923 births
2006 deaths
African-American history in Minneapolis–Saint Paul
African-American people in Minnesota politics
Activists for African-American civil rights
American boxing managers
American human rights activists
American anti-poverty advocates
Boxers from Minnesota
Politicians from Minneapolis
School desegregation pioneers
University of Minnesota alumni
American male boxers
Sportspeople from Minneapolis
North Community High School alumni
20th-century African-American sportspeople
21st-century African-American people
Sports coaches from Minneapolis